Kalle Vihtori Jäykkä (17 August 1869 – 8 November 1951) was a Finnish farmer and politician. He was born in  Vampula, and was a Member of the Parliament of Finland from 1913 to 1916, representing the Agrarian League.

References

1869 births
1951 deaths
People from Huittinen
People from Turku and Pori Province (Grand Duchy of Finland)
Centre Party (Finland) politicians
Members of the Parliament of Finland (1913–16)